El Beïda (sometimes written El Bayada) is a village in the commune of El Ouata, in Béchar Province, Algeria.

References

Neighbouring towns and cities

Populated places in Béchar Province